Peter Eiberg Thorup (14 December 1948 – 3 August 2007) was a Danish guitarist, singer, composer and record producer. He was one of the most important blues musicians in Denmark, and he was known outside his own country, when in the late 1960s he met Alexis Korner and the two formed the bands New Church, The Beefeaters, CCS, and later Snape.

Career
Thorup played at the age of 18 in the Danish band, Beefeaters, and he met Korner on his concert tour in Scandinavia. They formed New Church, and then in 1970 CCS around Korner and Thorup, the rest of the line-up was rather loose and depended on the  availability in the schedules of many musicians. Frequent performers within the band included Tony Carr (drums), trumpeter Harold Beckett, Herbie Flowers on bass guitar, Henry Lowther (trumpet) and Harold McNair with woodwind instruments. They were among the first groups to record on Mickie Most's RAK Records and John Cameron arranged their albums. They had several hit singles, commencing with a cover of Led Zeppelin's "Whole Lotta Love", which was used as the theme for BBC Television's Top Of The Pops.

Their music was characterised by Korner's growling vocals and Thorup's higher tones. They split in 1973 to create a band, Snape, that Korner and Thorup formed when on tour with King Crimson in the United States. King Crimson members Boz Burrell, Mel Collins, and Ian Wallace left Robert Fripp  in New Orleans to continue on tour with Korner. Thorup appeared on Korner's 1972 studio album Accidentally Born in New Orleans. A live album from this band was released in Germany. During this period, Thorup frequented London's nightclubs, performing with Korner and Colin Hodgkinson on bass.

In 1976 Thorup returned to Denmark to work with Danish musicians including Sebastian.

Thorup mostly played rock or blues, but he also got a local pop hit, recording a Danish version of Kenny Rogers and Dolly Parton's "Islands in the Stream" with Anne Grete in 1984. In the last couple of decades of his life he lived a quiet life, playing small concerts in Denmark and recording a few albums.

References

External links
 Obituary in Politiken (Danish online newspaper)

1948 births
2007 deaths
20th-century Danish male singers
Danish guitarists
Danish songwriters
Danish record producers
Blues guitarists
CCS (band) members
20th-century guitarists
People from Rudersdal Municipality
Olufsen Records artists